A good prime is a prime number whose square is greater than the product of any two primes at the same number of positions before and after it in the sequence of primes.

That is, good prime satisfies the inequality

for all 1 ≤ i ≤ n−1, where pk is the kth prime.

Example: the first primes are 2, 3, 5, 7 and 11. Since for 5 both the conditions
 

are fulfilled, 5 is a good prime.

There are infinitely many good primes.  The first good primes are:
5, 11, 17, 29, 37, 41, 53, 59, 67, 71, 97, 101, 127, 149, 179, 191, 223, 227, 251, 257, 269, 307, 311, 331, 347, 419, 431, 541, 557, 563, 569, 587, 593, 599, 641, 727, 733, 739, 809, 821, 853, 929, 937, 967 .

An alternative version takes only i = 1 in the definition. With that there are more good primes:
5, 11, 17, 29, 37, 41, 53, 59, 67, 71, 79, 97, 101, 107, 127, 137, 149, 157, 163, 173, 179, 191, 197, 211, 223, 227, 239, 251, 257, 263, 269, 277, 281, 307, 311, 331, 347, 367, 373, 379, 397, 419, 431, 439, 457, 461, 479, 487, 499, 521, 541, 557, 563, 569, 587, 593, 599, 607, 613, 617, 631, 641, 653, 659, 673, 701, 719, 727, 733, 739, 751, 757, 769, 787, 809, 821, 827, 853, 857, 877, 881, 907, 929, 937, 947, 967, 977, 991 .

References

Classes of prime numbers

fr:Liste de nombres premiers#Bon nombre premier